Rekom UK (formerly The Deltic Group Limited & The Luminar Group Ltd.) is a private company with an estate of 46 nightclubs and has the largest square footage of nightclub capacity in the United Kingdom.

History

Luminar Group Holdings plc was established in 1988, with the opening of its first nightclub, Manhattan Nitespot in King's Lynn, Norfolk. The continued growth in the discotheque division and the creation of the popular Chicago Rock Cafe concept meant Luminar became a successful leisure company of the early 1990s. It floated on the stock exchange in May 1996. There was a large expansion of Chicago Rock Cafes in the late 1990s. Luminar also ran and owned a couple of themed Australian restaurants, Tuckers Smokehouse, which opened at Kettering in Northamptonshire and Chelmsford in Essex. From August 1999 there were discussions with Northern Leisure about a possible merger. In November 1999, Luminar bought twenty nightclubs and seven bars from Allied Leisure for £34m.

Luminar bought Northern Leisure in May 2000 for £392m with a combined total of 237 nightclubs and late-night bars. In 2001 it opened 41 new venues, 44 in 2002, and 30 in 2003. In November 2003, it consolidated its range of nightclub brands into the four main divisions – Oceana, Liquid, Life and Lava-Ignite. In June 2005, it sold 49 nightclubs to a management buyout, which became CanDu Entertainment for £27m (which was later bought by Agilo in March 2008 after entering administration in March 2008).

Luminar sold the Entertainment division that included the Jumpin Jaks and Chicago Rock Cafe brands to 3D Entertainment in December 2006 for £79m, in a sale and leaseback deal.

Luminar Group Holdings plc was placed into liquidation on 26 October 2011. Luminar Group Ltd was incorporated on 5 December 2011 and headed up by former managing director Peter Marks, retaining the brands and most of the venues the previous company operated.

The Luminar Group Limited acquired both Chicago Leisure Limited and Chicago Leisure (MK) Limited on 7 November 2014. On 17 May 2015, The Luminar Group was rebranded as The Deltic Group Limited, with their recent expansion into the late bar market.

In December 2020, Deltic Group announced that it was on the brink of administration and looking for a buyer. On 17 December 2020 it was reported that Scandinavian company Rekom had purchased The Deltic Group with Peter Marks continuing on as CEO of the UK sites.

Locations 
The company created the Atik brand in 2016, which has the following locations:

 Aberdeen - opened 2018, replaced the Institute club which had been open since 2012
 Colchester
 Dartford
 Edinburgh - replaced Cav
 Gloucester
 Hull
 Oxford - opened in 2016, replaced Lava & Ignite
 Romford
 Tamworth
 Windsor
 Wrexham

Controversies
In June 2019, the company along with door staff company Securigroup Services Ltd, and its former general manager Wayne Mason were ordered to pay £110,000 in fines and court costs, for creating a fire risk hazard at its Kuda nightclub in York.

References

External links

Hotel and leisure companies of the United Kingdom
Companies based in Milton Keynes
Entertainment companies established in 1988
Privately held companies of the United Kingdom